Salvador Rodríguez (born 13 November 1980, in Madrid) is a retired Spanish sprinter who specialised in the 400 metres. He represented his country at one outdoor and three indoor World Championships.

Competition record

Personal bests
Outdoor
200 metres – 20.93 (+1.0 m/s) (Avilés 2003)
400 metres – 45.95 (Madrid 2003)
Indoor
400 metres – 46.78 (Seville 2002)

References

1980 births
Living people
Spanish male sprinters
World Athletics Championships athletes for Spain
Athletes from Madrid
Athletes (track and field) at the 2001 Mediterranean Games
Mediterranean Games competitors for Spain